Western United Football Club is an Australian professional association football club based in Trugania, Victoria. The club was formed as Western Melbourne before being renamed as Western United.

The list encompasses records set by the club, their managers and their players. The player records section itemises the club's leading goalscorers and those who have made most appearances in first-team competitions. Attendance records are also included.

The club's record appearance maker is Connor Pain, who has currently made 101 appearances between 2019 and the present day. Besart Berisha is Western United's goalscorer, scoring 26 goals in total.

All figures are correct as of 4 March 2023

Honours and achievements

Domestic
 A-League Men Championship
 Winners (1): 2022

Player records

Appearances
 Most A-League Men appearances: Connor Pain, 98
 Most Australia Cup appearances: Dylan Pierias, 4
 Youngest first-team player: Luke Duzel, 18 years, 25 days (against Central Coast Mariners, A-League, 1 March 2020)
 Oldest first-team player: Alessandro Diamanti, 39 years, 306 days (against Perth Glory, A-League Men, 4 March 2023)
 Most consecutive appearances: Dylan Pierias, 56

Most appearances
Competitive matches only, includes appearances as substitute. Numbers in brackets indicate goals scored.

Goalscorers
 Most goals in a season: Besart Berisha, 19 goals (in the 2019–20 season)
 Most A-League Men goals in a season: Besart Berisha, 19 goals in the A-League, 2019–20
 Most goals in a match: 3 goals
 Max Burgess (against Central Coast Mariners, A-League, 1 March 2020)
 Lachlan Wales (against Perth Glory, A-League Men, 16 April 2022
 Youngest goalscorer: Nicolas Milanovic, 20 years, 79 days (against Macarthur FC, A-League Men, 1 February 2022)
 Oldest goalscorer: Alessandro Diamanti, 39 years, 264 days (against Sydney FC, A-League Men, 13 November 2022)
 Most consecutive goalscoring appearances: Besart Berisha, 4 matches (7 August 2020 – 19 August 2020)

Top goalscorers
Besart Berisha is the all-time top goalscorer for Western United and has always been since the club's first competitive match in October 2019.

Competitive matches only. Numbers in brackets indicate appearances made.

Managerial records

 First full-time manager: Mark Rudan managed Western United from 2019 to present.
 Longest-serving manager: Mark Rudan – 2 years, 16 days (23 May 2019 to 8 June 2021)
 Shortest tenure as manager: Mark Rudan – 2 years, 16 days (23 May 2019 to 8 June 2021)
 Highest win percentage: John Aloisi, 45.28%
 Lowest win percentage: Mark Rudan, 38.89%

Club records

Matches

Firsts
 First match: Caroline Springs George Cross 0–4 Western United, friendly, 22 August 2019
 First A-League Men match: Wellington Phoenix 0–1 Western United, 13 October 2019
 First Australia Cup match: Western United 2–1 Newcastle Jets, 13 November 2021
 First match at Geelong: Western United 1–1 Perth Glory, A-League, 19 October 2019
 First home match at AAMI Park: Western United 0–0 Melbourne Victory, A-League, 30 January 2021

Record wins
 Record A-League Men win: 6–0 against Perth Glory, 20 April 2022
 Record Australia Cup win:
 2–1 against Newcastle Jets, 13 November 2021
 2–1 against Melbourne Victory, 3 August 2022

Record defeats
 Record A-League Men defeat:
 0–5 against Western Sydney Wanderers, A-League, 8 May 2021
 1–6 against Melbourne Victory, A-League, 28 May 2021
 Record Australia Cup defeat: 0–1 against Wellington Phoenix, 7 December 2021

Record consecutive results
 Record consecutive wins: 4, from 20 February 2022 to 5 March 2022
 Record consecutive defeats: 8, from 5 May 2021 to 5 June 2021
 Record consecutive matches without a defeat: 9, from 29 January 2022 to 12 March 2022
 Record consecutive matches without a win: 9, from 30 April 2021 to 5 June 2021
 Record consecutive matches without conceding a goal: 2
 from 26 April 2021 to 30 April 2021
 from 26 November 2021 to 4 December 2021
 from 11 December 2021 to 17 December 2021
 from 23 February 2022 to 27 February 2022
 from 16 April 2022 to 19 April 2022
 from 18 December 2022 to 26 December 2022
 Record consecutive matches without scoring a goal: 4, from 8 May 2021 to 22 May 2021

Goals
 Most A-League Men goals scored in a season: 46 in 26 matches, 2019–20
 Fewest A-League Men goals scored in a season: 30 in 26 matches, 2020–21
 Most A-League Men goals conceded in a season: 47 in 26 matches, 2020–21
 Fewest A-League Men goals conceded in a season: 30 in 26 matches, 2021–22

Points
 Most points in a season: 45 in 26 matches, 2021–22
 Fewest points in a season: 28 in 26 matches, 2020–21

Attendances
 Highest attendance at AAMI Park: 8,127, against Melbourne City, A-League Men, 12 March 2022
 Lowest attendance at AAMI Park: 990, against Newcastle Jets, A-League, 26 April 2021
 Highest attendance in Geelong: 10,128, against Melbourne Victory, A-League at GMHBA Stadium, 8 December 2019
 Lowest attendance in Geelong: 1,127 against Newcastle Jets, FFA Cup play-offs, 13 November 2021

References

Western United
Records